The Governor of the Bank of Spain is the head of the Bank of Spain, the central bank of the Kingdom of Spain. The Bank of Spain is integrated in the European System of Central Banks and, as such, the Governor is an ex officio member of the Governing Council of the European Central Bank.

The Governor is appointed by the executive branch and it reports to both Government and Parliament. To ensure its independence, the governor has a term of six years, with no possibility of renewal. Further, the governor cannot be fired except for exceptional cases.

The current and 70th governor is Pablo Hernández de Cos, whose appointment was official on May 31 and he assumed the office on June 11, 2018.

Appointment process

As stipulated by the Bank of Spain Autonomy Act of 1994, the Monarch appoints the Governor, the Deputy Governor and the rest of members of the Bank's Governing Council and Executive Committee. The governor is nominated by the Prime Minister, while the deputy governor is nominated by the incumbent governor.

The governor has a special appointment process. Before the appointment, the Minister of Economy must appear before the Congress of Deputies' Economy Committee to inform them about the candidate. The candidate does not need the approval of Congress, although as a requirement, the candidate is required to be a Spanish person with recognized competence in monetary or banking matters.

The governor's and deputy governor's term’s lasts six years and is not renewable. The governor and deputy governor only leave the office when the term ends, by resignation or when the Government proves that the governor has a permanent incapacity for the exercise of their powers, serious breach of their obligations, office incompatibility or prosecution for a criminal offense.

Functions
The governor's functions are:
To direct the Bank and preside over the Governing Council and the Executive Committee.
To legally represent the Bank for all purposes and, especially, before courts of justice, as well as authorize contracts and documents and perform the other activities that are necessary for performance of the functions entrusted to the Bank of Spain.
To represent the Bank of Spain in institutions and international organizations in which it is expected to participate.
To hold the status of member of the Governing Council and of the General Council of the European Central Bank.

List of governors
This is a list of the people that have served as Governor of the Bank of Spain. This title was adopted in 1856, although the Bank's roots dates back to 1782.
January 1856 – November 1863: Ramón de Santillán (Lerma, Burgos, 1791).
November 1863 – April 1866: Francisco Santa Cruz Pacheco (Orihuela, Alicante, 1802).
April 1866 – July 1866: Victorio Fernández Lazcoiti (Oviedo, Asturias, 1805).
July 1866 – October 1868: Juan Bautista Trúpita (Huércal–Overa, Almería, 1815).
October 1868 – December 1876: Manuel Cantero San Vicente (Madrid, 1804).
January 1877 – October 1877: Pedro Salaverría (Santander, 1810).
October 1877 – February 1878: José Elduayen y Gorriti (Madrid, 1823).
February 1878 – March 1881: Martín Belda y Mencía del Barrio (Córdoba, 1815).
March 1881 – October 1883: Antonio Romero Ortiz (Santiago de Compostela, La Coruña, 1822).
October 1883 – January 1884: Juan Francisco Camacho (Cádiz, 1813).
January 1884 – February 1885: Francisco de Cárdenas Espejo (Sevilla, 1816).
February 1885 – August 1890: Salvador Albacete y Albert (Cartagena, Murcia, 1822).
August 1890 – November 1891: Cayetano Sánchez Bustillo (Llanes, Asturias, 1839).
November 1891– April 1892: Juan Francisco Camacho (Cádiz, 1813).
April 1892 – December 1892: Santos de Isasa y Valseca (Montoro, Córdoba, 1822).
December 1892 – April 1895: Pío Gullón e Iglesias (Astorga, León, 1835).
April 1895 – September 1895: Santos de Isasa y Valseca (Montoro, Córdoba, 1822).
September 1895 – December 1895: Manuel Aguirre de Tejada (Ferrol, La Coruña, 1829).
December 1895 – October 1897: José García Barzanallana (Madrid, 1819).
October 1897 – March 1899: Manuel de Eguilior Llaguno (Limpias, Santander, 1842).
March 1899 – October 1899: Luis María de la Torre y de la Hoz (Anaz, Santander, 1827).
October 1899 – December 1899: Antonio María Fabié (Sevilla, 1834).
January 1900 – April 1901: Juan de la Concha Castañeda (Plasencia, Cáceres, 1818).
April 1901 – February 1902: Pío Gullón e Iglesias (Astorga, León, 1835).
July 1902 – December 1902;Andrés Mellado Fernández (Málaga, 1846).
December 1902 – July 1903: Antonio García Alix (Murcia, 1852).
July 1903 – December 1903: José Sánchez Guerra y Martínez (Córdoba, 1859).
December 1903 – December 1904: Tomás Castellano y Villarroya (Zaragoza, 1850).
December 1904 – August 1905: Manuel Allendesalazar (Guernica, Vizcaya, 1856).
August 1905 – June 1906: Trinitario Ruiz y Capdepón (Orihuela, Alicante, 1836).
June 1906 – January 1907: Fernando Merino Villarino (León, 1869).
January 1907 – September 1908: José Sánchez Guerra (Córdoba, 1859).
September 1908 – October 1909: Antonio García Alix (Murcia, 1852).
October 1909 – February 1910: Fernando Merino Villarino (León, 1869).
February 1910 – April 1911: Tirso Rodrigáñez y Sagasta (Logroño, 1853).
April 1911 – November 1913: Eduardo Cobián y Roffignac (Pontevedra, 1857).
November 1913 – January 1916: Lorenzo Domínguez Pascual (Sevilla, 1863).
January 1916 – July 1916: Manuel de Eguilior Llaguno (Limpias, Santander, 1842).
July 1916 – June 1917: Amós Salvador Rodrigáñez (Logroño, 1845).
June 1917 – November 1917: Lorenzo Domínguez Pascual (Sevilla, 1863).
November 1917 – April 1919: Tirso Rodrigáñez y Sagasta (Logroño, 1853).
April 1919 – October 1919: Manuel Allendesalazar (Guernica, Vizcaya, 1856).
October 1919 – March 1921: Eduardo Sanz Escartín (Pamplona, Navarra, 1855).
March 1921 – August 1921: José Maestre Pérez (Monòver, Alicante, 1866).
August 1921 – March 1922: Luis Alfonso Sedó Guichard (Madrid, 1873).
March 1922 – January 1923: Salvador Bermúdez de Castro (Madrid, 1863).
January 1923 – September 1923: Tirso Rodrigáñez y Sagasta (Logroño, 1853).
February 1924 – October 1929: Carlos Vergara Caillaux (Getafe, Madrid, 1854).
October 1929 – February 1930: José Manuel Figueras Arizcun (Bilbao, Vizcaya)
February 1930 – August 1930: Juan Antonio Gamazo y Abarca (Boecillo, Valladolid, 1840)
August 1930 – April 1931: Federico Carlos Bas Vasallo (Alicante, 1881).
April 1931 – September 1933: Julio Carabias Salcedo (Valladolid, 1883). 
September 1933 – March 1934: Manuel Marraco Ramón (Zaragoza, 1870).
March 1934 – April 1935: Alfredo de Zavala y Lafora (Madrid, 1893).
April 1935 – mayo de 1935: Alejandro Fernández de Araoz (Medina del Campo, Valladolid, 1894).
mayo de 1935 – February 1936: Alfredo de Zavala y Lafora (Madrid, 1893).
March 1936 – August 1938: Luis Nicolau d'Olwer (Barcelona, 1888).
April 1938 – August 1950: Antonio Goicoechea (Barcelona, 1876).
August 1950 – September 1951: Francisco de Cárdenas y de la Torre (Madrid, 1875).
September 1951 – December 1963: Joaquín Benjumea y Burín (Sevilla, 1878).
July 1965 – July 1970: Mariano Navarro Rubio (Barbaquena, Teruel, 1913).
July 1970 – August 1976: Luis Coronel de Palma (Madrid, 1925).
August 1976 – March 1978: José María López de Letona (Burgos, 1922).
March 1978 – July 1984: José Ramón Álvarez Rendueles (Gijón, 1940).
July 1984 – July 1992: Mariano Rubio Jiménez (Burgos, 1931).
July 1992 – July 2000: Luis Ángel Rojo Duque (Madrid, 1934).
July 2000 – July 2006: Jaime Caruana Lacorte (Valencia, 1952).
July 2006 – June 2012: Miguel Ángel Fernández Ordóñez (Madrid, 1945).
June 2012 – June 2018: Luis María Linde (Madrid, 1945).
June 2018 – June 2024: Pablo Hernández de Cos (Madrid, 1971).

References

External links

 
Lists of political office-holders in Spain
Spain